Arturo Vergara Medina (13 July 1920 – 19 June 1986), better known by his stage name Bentot or Ben Cosca, was a Filipino comedian and vaudevillian who spent most of his career under LVN Pictures.  He had many box office hits with another famed comedian Pugo who played his father in their films.  He also appeared on the Manila bodabil circuit in its heyday in the fifties and early sixties.

Biography
Arturo Vergara Medina was born in San Simon, Pampanga in 1920.

He made his first movie appearance in 1947's Maria Kapra, a musical by Sampaguita Pictures with Angel Esmeralda. He made his second and last movie for Sampaguita in 1951's Batas ng Daigdig aka Rule of the World. Then he moved to the rival studio of Sampaguita, LVN, and stayed until the film studio closed in 1961.

Bentot had a second life in radio and television, appearing in the radio and later TV comedy series Tang Tarang Tang with Pugo, Rosa Aguirre and Marita Zobel.

He is the father of former child star Bentot Jr.

Death
Bentot died in June 19, 1986 in Manila, Philippines at the age of 65 due to heart failure, a month shy of his 66th birthday.

Filmography

Film
1947 - Maria Kapra [Sampaguita]
1951 - Batas ng Daigdig [Sampaguita]
1957 - Phone Pal [LVN]
1957 - Sebya, Mahal Kita [LVN]
1958 - Alembong [LVN]
1958 - Mr. Kuripot [LVN]
1960 - Nukso ng Nukso [LVN]
1960 - Oh Sendang! [LVN]
1976 - Taho-Ichi [GPS]
1985 - The Crazy Professor [RVQ]
1986 - Praybeyt Depektib Akademi (his last movie)

Discography
1978 - Jeproks - Plaka Pilipino Records
1978 - Burloloy - Plaka Pilipino Records

References

External links 
 
 Bentot film clips

1920 births
1986 deaths
Filipino television personalities
Filipino male comedians
Male actors from Pampanga
20th-century Filipino male actors
20th-century comedians
Filipino male film actors